Cuccaro may refer to these Italian municipalities:

Lu e Cuccaro Monferrato, in the province of Alessandria, Piedmont
Cuccaro Vetere, in the province of Salerno, Campania